Pipa parva (common names: Sabana Surinam toad and dwarf toad), is a species of frog in the family Pipidae. It is found in northwestern Venezuela and northeastern Colombia (Norte de Santander and La Guajira Departments), mainly in the Maracaibo Basin. There is an introduced (and expanding) population in the Lake Valencia Basin in northern Venezuela.

Description
Adult males measure  and females  in snout–vent length. The head is narrow in the dorsal view, and the snout is pointed; the eyes are large. The body is relatively slender. Skin is tuberculate. The webbing between the fingers and toes is transparent.

Habitat and conservation
Its natural habitats are lakes, ponds, and marshes in flat, open areas, such as grassland and flooded habitats. They are able to cross land areas. The female carries the eggs on her back, from where the hatching tadpoles emerge into water where the development continues.

Pipa parva is a very common species that may even be treated as a pest. There are no known threats (pest control seems to have a negligible impact on populations). On the contrary, the potential expansion of this species into the Orinoco Basin is seen as a threat.

References

Pipa (frog)
Amphibians of Colombia
Amphibians of Venezuela
Taxa named by Helen Beulah Thompson Gaige
Taxa named by Alexander Grant Ruthven
Amphibians described in 1923
Taxonomy articles created by Polbot